Maxime Blanchette-Joncas  (born 1989) is a Canadian politician, who was elected to the House of Commons of Canada in the 2019 election. He represents the electoral district of Rimouski-Neigette—Témiscouata—Les Basques as a member of the Bloc Québécois.

Electoral record

References

External links
 

Bloc Québécois MPs
Living people
1989 births
Members of the House of Commons of Canada from Quebec
People from Rimouski
21st-century Canadian politicians